The following is a list of films originally produced and/or distributed theatrically by Metro-Goldwyn-Mayer and released between 1930 and 1939.

See also 
 Lists of Metro-Goldwyn-Mayer films

References 

1930-1939
American films by studio
1930s in American cinema
Lists of 1930s films